Deligiorgis, Deligeorgis , is a Greek surname. Notable people with the surname include: 

Dimitrios Deligeorgis,  Greek revolutionary and politician
Epameinondas Deligeorgis, Greek lawyer, newspaper reporter, and politician
Nikolaos Deligiorgis, Greek magazine editor and publisher

Greek-language surnames